Roland Irwin Christopher Holder (born 22 December 1967) is a cricketer, born in Port of Spain, Trinidad who played the majority of his first class cricket for Barbados. He made his debut for Barbados in 1986 while still a schoolboy at Combermere School, and played through to the 2000/01 season. He also played 11 Tests and 37 One Day Internationals for the West Indies, between 1993 and 1999, making his Test debut against India at Sabina Park, Jamaica in 1997.

He captained Barbados from 1992 to 94 and in 1999, leading them to victory in the Busta Cup in the latter season, but was left out of the 38-man training squad for the 2001/02 season. Instead, he was selected to lead the 'West Indies B' squad in the Busta Cup.

In 2004, Holder was appointed manager to the Barbados cricket team, having spent a number of years as a senior member of the West Indies Players' Association.

First Class Career
In a 16-year career spanning from 1986 to 2002, he compiled 5945 runs in 105 games at an average of 37.86.

International career
Holder made his Test debut against India at Sabina Park in 1997, scoring 21 and 17 not out in a drawn game. He followed that with 91 in the next Test in Trinidad, helping West Indies recover from 169 for six to 296 all out in the first innings. Despite his promising start, he would cross 50 just once more in his next 14 innings before being dropped in 1999.

In ODIs, his best performance was a 48-ball 65 in a losing cause against New Zealand in Trinidad in 1996.

Notes and references 

1967 births
Living people
Barbados cricketers
West Indies One Day International cricketers
West Indies Test cricketers
West Indies B cricketers
Cricketers at the 1996 Cricket World Cup
Cricketers at the 1998 Commonwealth Games
Commonwealth Games competitors for Barbados
Trinidad and Tobago cricketers